The Northern Front electoral district was a constituency created for the 1917 Russian Constituent Assembly election. The constituency covered the Northern Front of the Russian Army. And apart from the Northern Front itself, the electoral district also included the Russian troops stationed in Finland (except those under the Baltic Fleet command) as well as the Lake Peipus Flotilla. Voter turnout stood at 72.36482% per official records.

Results

References

Electoral districts of the Russian Constituent Assembly election, 1917